Guillaume Amyot (10 December 1843 – 30 March 1896) was a Canadian politician, editor, and lawyer. After finishing his classical studies at the Collège de Sainte-Anne-de-la-Pocatière, Amyot chose a lawyer career. He was a Member of the House of Commons of Canada, which he entered in 1881, for the riding of Bellechasse, Quebec representing the historical Conservative Party. He later switched affiliation to Nationalist and was re-elected in the 1887 election then re-elected as a Nationalist Conservative in the election of 1891.

Prior to entering federal politics, he stood for election twice in the Quebec general elections of 1875 and 1878, in the riding of Lotbinière. He was defeated both times by Henri-Gustave Joly de Lotbinière.

Amyot was also a participant in the North-West Rebellion of 1885 and was a Lieutenant-Colonel of the 9th battalion of the Voltigeurs of Quebec.

References 

 Biography at the Dictionary of Canadian Biography Online
 

Canadian male journalists
Canadian newspaper editors
19th-century Canadian lawyers
Conservative Party of Canada (1867–1942) MPs
Journalists from Quebec
Members of the House of Commons of Canada from Quebec
1842 births
1896 deaths
Place of death missing
Nationalist Conservative MPs
19th-century Canadian journalists
19th-century Canadian male writers